Sphagoeme suturalis is a species of beetle in the family Cerambycidae. It was described by Martins in 1977.

References

Oemini
Beetles described in 1977